Kiss Like Wine is a 2018 Burmese romantic-drama film, directed by Aung Myat starring Aung Ye Lin and Wutt Hmone Shwe Yi. The film, produced by  Sein Htay Film Production premiered in Myanmar on February 2, 2018.

Cast
Aung Ye Lin as Moe Thit Pin
Wutt Hmone Shwe Yi as La Yake Aye
Soe Myat Thuzar as Daw Ma Ma Shin
Min Oo as U Sai Aik
Kyaw Kyaw as Lin Khine
Zaw Oo as U Lon
Wah Wah Aung as Kyi Kyi Nan

References

2018 films
2010s Burmese-language films
Burmese romantic drama films
Films shot in Myanmar
2018 romantic drama films